Richard James Boushka (July 29, 1934 – February 19, 2019) was an American basketball player who competed in the 1956 Summer Olympics.  Born in Springfield, Illinois, Boushka played collegiately at Saint Louis University.

In addition to his play on the gold-medal winning 1956 American Olympic team, he was a member of the American team in the 1959 Pan American Games and was a standout player for the Wichita Kansas) Vickers of the AAU. Boushka eventually became the president of team sponsor Vickers Petroleum. Boushka was named to the Saint Louis Billikens All Century Team. He was on the team with other Saint Louis players such as Jordair Jett, Anthony Bonner, and Larry Hughes.

Investments
After parimutuel gambling was legalized in Kansas in 1986, Boushka approached RD Hubbard with the idea of a greyhound track. The Los Angeles Times wrote that they planned on building a "combined horse-dog complex, and now Kansas has a $70-million facility [named The Woodlands], the two tracks sharing a joint parking lot." According to Hubbard, "if we didn't do what we did, the greyhounds and the horses would have wound up competing against one another in the same market. It was a better idea getting the two industries to work together." In Kansas City, they funded the construction and opening of The Woodlands racing park in 1989. Built to serve as both a greyhound track and later as a horse racing track, the venue was the first legal gambling outlet in the area since the 1930s, and in its second year attendance peaked at 1.7 million attendees.

Death
Boushka died on February 19, 2019.

References

External links

1934 births
2019 deaths
All-American college men's basketball players
Amateur Athletic Union men's basketball players
American men's basketball players
Basketball players at the 1956 Summer Olympics
Basketball players at the 1959 Pan American Games
Basketball players from Illinois
Forwards (basketball)
Medalists at the 1956 Summer Olympics
Minneapolis Lakers draft picks
Olympic gold medalists for the United States in basketball
Pan American Games gold medalists for the United States
Pan American Games medalists in basketball
Saint Louis Billikens men's basketball players
Sportspeople from Springfield, Illinois
United States men's national basketball team players
Medalists at the 1959 Pan American Games